Duilio Herrera Ibarra (born 12 November 2004) is a Mexican professional footballer who currently plays for Rio Grande Valley FC in USL Championship.

Career

Youth
Herrera played as part of the Rio Grande Valley FC academy for five years, where he made more than one hundred appearances for the Toros in both the USL Academy competition and the MLS Next. Herrera signed a USL academy contract with the club's USL Championship first team on 9 February 2022. He made his debut on 12 March 2022, appearing as an 83rd–minute substitute during a 1–0 win over Oakland Roots.

References

External links
 

2004 births
Living people
Association football forwards
Mexican expatriate footballers
Mexican expatriate sportspeople in the United States
Mexican footballers
People from Edinburg, Texas
Rio Grande Valley FC Toros players
Soccer players from Texas
USL Championship players